Evandro Rachoni de Lima (born 24 November 1989) is a Brazilian professional footballer who plays for German club TuS Rüssingen, as a goalkeeper.

Early and personal life
Evandro grew up in Rio de Janeiro. He also holds an Italian passport, which he is eligible for due to his grandfather. His brother-in-law is also a footballer who has played in the Ukrainian Premier League.

Career
Evandro's early career was spent in Brazil and Angola with Rio Claro, Batatais, Santo André, São Bernardo, Fluminense, Interclube and ASA. He then played in Ukraine with Arsenal Kyiv and FK Retro, but his time there was interrupted by the unrest in that country. During his time in Ukraine his team bus was boarded by gunmen. He moved to London in September 2014, signing for non-league club London Bari a few days later. While playing for London Bari he was scouted by Premier League club West Ham United, and he also had interest from France and the United States. After a brief spell with Concord Rangers, where he made 1 league appearance, he signed for League One club Crawley Town in January 2015, on non-contract terms. He made his debut for Crawley in the Sussex Senior Cup on 13 January 2015. He trialled with Peterborough United, but the transfer fell through after a change in management at the club. After a spell with Bishop's Stortford, he signed for Ilkeston in July 2015. He has been nicknamed "Brazilian Bob" by Ilkeston's fans. He left the club by mutual consent in January 2016. He signed for German club Wormatia Worms in February 2016, making one appearance for the senior team and four appearances for the second team. He moved to SV Gimbsheim in July 2016. After a spell in the United States with Red Force FC, Rachoni returned to Germany, playing with RWO Alzey, and TuS Rüssingen.

References

1989 births
Living people
Brazilian footballers
Brazilian people of Italian descent
Association football goalkeepers
Rio Claro Futebol Clube players
Batatais Futebol Clube players
Esporte Clube Santo André players
São Bernardo Futebol Clube players
Fluminense FC players
G.D. Interclube players
Atlético Sport Aviação players
FC Arsenal Kyiv players
Concord Rangers F.C. players
Crawley Town F.C. players
Bishop's Stortford F.C. players
Ilkeston F.C. players
Wormatia Worms players
Red Force FC players
RWO Alzey players
Brazilian expatriate footballers
Brazilian expatriate sportspeople in Angola
Expatriate footballers in Angola
Brazilian expatriate sportspeople in Ukraine
Expatriate footballers in Ukraine
Brazilian expatriate sportspeople in England
Expatriate footballers in England
Brazilian expatriate sportspeople in Germany
Expatriate footballers in Germany
Brazilian expatriate sportspeople in the United States
Expatriate soccer players in the United States